Greater Idaho is a movement to transfer counties in eastern Oregon to Idaho.

In 2020, the group called "Move Oregon's Border for a Greater Idaho" proposed breaking off most of Oregon's area and some of Northern California and join it with Idaho.  Even if passed by voters, it would still need approval from both state legislatures as well as the Federal government. In 2021, five counties in eastern Oregon voted to "require county officials to take steps to promote" adding the counties to Idaho. In May 2022, voters in Douglas and Josephine counties rejected an advisory vote, causing the proponents to scale back the scope of the proposal and issue a "less ambitious" map.  The reduced scope includes only eastern Oregon, does not include any California territory, and only includes a little more than a third of the original map’s inhabitants.

As of November 2022, eleven counties in Oregon had approved ballot measures in favor of Greater Idaho: Baker, Grant, Harney, Jefferson, Klamath, Lake, Malheur, Morrow, Sherman, Union, and Wheeler.

In February, 2023, the House State Affairs committee of the Idaho House of Representatives approved a resolution to authorize the legislature to discuss moving the state border with Oregon lawmakers. This was subsequently passed by the House.

See also
List of U.S. state partition proposals

References

Politics of Oregon
Politics of Idaho
Separatism in the United States
Proposed states and territories of the United States